Events from the year 1906 in France.

Incumbents
President: Émile Loubet (until 18 February), Armand Fallières (starting 18 February)
President of the Council of Ministers: 
 until 7 March: Maurice Rouvier
 12 March – 20 October: Ferdinand Sarrien
 starting 25 October: Georges Clemenceau

Events
16 January - Algeciras Conference begins, to mediate the First Moroccan Crisis between France and Germany.
10 March - Courrières mine disaster: Explosion in coal mine in Courrières kills 1099.
7 April - Final agreement from Algeciras Conference is signed.
6 May - Legislative Election held.
20 May - Legislative Election held.
June - First Paris motor bus line opened by C.G.O. (Compagnie Générale des Omnibus).
12 July - Alfred Dreyfus, the Jewish army officer hastily and wrongly convicted of treason in 1899, is exonerated.
21 July - Dreyfus is reinstalled in the French Army 21 July, ending the Dreyfus Affair.
23 October - Santos-Dumont 14-bis aircraft performs the first publicly witnessed European unaided take-off by a heavier-than-air aircraft, in Bagatelle.

Sport
26–27 June - 1906 French Grand Prix at Le Mans; French cars take the major prizes.
4 July - Tour de France begins.
29 July - Tour de France ends, won by René Pottier.

Births

January to June
5 January - Pierre Seghers, poet and editor (died 1987)
21 February - Jeanne Aubert, singer and actress (died 1988)
8 March - Louis Peglion, cyclist (died 1986)
9 March - Joseph Mauclair, cyclist (died 1990)
18 March - Paul Rassinier, pacifist, political activist and author (died 1967)
25 March - Jean Sablon, singer and actor (died 1994)
26 March - Henri Cadiou, painter and lithographer (died 1989)
27 March - Bernard Lefebvre, photographer (died 1992)
2 April – Maurice Thiriet, composer (died 1972)
6 May - André Weil, mathematician (died 1998)
7 June - Alexandre Renard, Roman Catholic Cardinal (died 1983)
24 June - Pierre Fournier, cellist (died 1986)

July to September
1 July - Jean Dieudonné, mathematician (died 1992)
6 July - Colette Audry, novelist, screenwriter and critic (died 1990)
7 July - Charles Vaurie, ornithologist (died 1975)
27 July - Roger Duchesne, actor (died 1996)
30 July - Alex Thépot, international soccer player (died 1989)
18 August - Marcel Carné, film director (died 1996)
6 September - Luis Federico Leloir, physician and biochemist, recipient of 1970 Nobel Prize in Chemistry (died 1987)
12 September - Jacques Lacarrière, ice hockey player (died 2005)
30 September - Mireille Hartuch, singer, composer and actress (died 1996)

October to December
3 October - Raymond Triboulet, resistance fighter and politician (died 2006)
22 October - Marcel Ichac, alpinist, explorer, photographer and film director (died 1994)
7 November
Jean Leray, mathematician (died 1998)
Pierre Magne, cyclist (died 1980)
14 November - Claude Ménard, field athlete, Olympic medallist (died 1980)
19 November -Jacques Leguerney, composer (died 1997)
16 November - Henri Charrière, convicted felon and author (died 1973)
10 December - Jules Ladoumègue, athlete and Olympic medallist (died 1973)
18 December - Ferdinand Alquié, philosopher (died 1985)
27 December - Andreas Feininger, French-born German-American photographer (died 1999)

Deaths
1 April - Léon Fairmaire, entomologist (born 1820)
18 April - Louis Gustave Vapereau, writer and lexicographer (born 1819)
19 April - Pierre Curie, physicist, shared the 1903 Nobel Prize in physics (born 1859)
5 July - Jules Adolphe Aimé Louis Breton, painter (born 1827)
26 August - Victor, 5th duc de Broglie, aristocrat (born 1846)
18 October - Léon Gastinel, composer (born 1813)
22 October - Paul Cézanne, painter (born 1839)
5 September - Albert Tissandier, architect, aviator, illustrator, editor and archaeologist (born 1839)
9 December - Ferdinand Brunetière, writer and critic (born 1849)

See also
 List of French films before 1910

References

1900s in France